Burak Güven (born October 9, 1975) is a Turkish musician, bass player, and one of the backing singers in the rock band Mor ve Ötesi.

Biography 
He was born in İstanbul, Turkey. From 1993 to 2000, Burak studied singing at the State Conservatory of İstanbul. Before he became a member of the group, he sang in the choir and opera. He became one of the first participants of İstanbul Blues Company.

Creative activity 
When he was 14 years old, Burak bought his first guitar. At age 15, he began to play in a group Virus with four friends and was a vocalist. After disagreements with guitarist Erke Erokay, he left the group. He then worked with pop performer Eric Coker and sang in cafes and bars for living.

In 1993, Burak bought his first bass guitar. He was one of the first participants in İstanbul Blues Kumpanyası. He toured and played bass guitar in four songs in their album Kökler. He sang in the opera Aşk İksiri and musical Anlat Şehrazat in 1997. He also participated in the choir Fahir Atakoğlu. His voice can be heard on the CD Senfonik Konser. He participated in the Mimi Festival in France with a group, Nekropsi. He still composes electronic musics with his friend Tolga Enilmez, who is a member of that collective.

In 1997, he became a member of Mor ve Ötesi, replacing Alper Tekin, who left the band.

In January 2009, the album Astronot of Ayça Şen was released, produced by Burak Güven.

External links 
 

1975 births
Mor ve Ötesi members
Living people
Turkish male singers
Turkish rock guitarists
Turkish rock singers
Eurovision Song Contest entrants of 2008
Eurovision Song Contest entrants for Turkey